The Syracuse Orange women represented Syracuse University in CHA women's ice hockey during the 2014-15 NCAA Division I women's ice hockey season. The Orange finished conference play in second place, and advanced to the CHA Tournament Final, before losing to RIT 2-1 in double overtime.

Offseason
July 7: Thirteen players were named to the CHA All-Academic Team.

Recruiting

Standings

Roster

2014–15 Orange

Schedule

|-
!colspan=12 style="background:#0a2351; "| Regular Season

|-
!colspan=12 style="background:#0a2351; "| CHA Tournament

Awards and honors

Stephanie Grossi, 2014-15 CHA Rookie of the Year
Paul Flanagan, 2014-15 CHA Coach of the Year
Nicole Renault, 2014-15 All-CHA First Team
Melissa Piacentini, 2014-15 All-CHA First Team
Jennifer Gilligan, 2014-15 All-CHA Second Team
Akane Hosoyamada, 2014-15 All-CHA Second Team
Stephanie Grossi, 2014-15 All-CHA Rookie Team
Alysha Burriss, 2014-15 All-CHA Rookie Team

References

Syracuse
Syracuse Orange women's ice hockey seasons
Syracuse Orange
Syracuse Orange